Porthmeia is a genus of moths in the subfamily Lymantriinae erected by George Thomas Bethune-Baker in 1908. They are native to the island of New Guinea.

Species
Porthmeia subnigra Bethune-Baker, 1908
Porthmeia pyrozona Collenette, 1930
Porthmeia bicolora Bethune-Baker, 1908

References

Lymantriinae